Krishnagar Women's College, established in 1958, is a women's college in Krishnagar, in Nadia district, West Bengal, India. It offers undergraduate courses in arts and sciences. It is affiliated to  University of Kalyani. Manabi Bandopadhyay, India's first openly transgender college principal, began work as such as the principal of Krishnagar Women's College in 2015.

Departments

Science

Chemistry
Physics
Mathematics

Arts

Bengali
English
Sanskrit
History
Geography
Political Science
Philosophy
Economics

Accreditation
The college is recognized by the University Grants Commission (UGC). It was accredited by the National Assessment and Accreditation Council (NAAC), and in 2016 awarded B+ grade, an accreditation that has since then expired.

See also

References

External links
Krishnagar Women's College
University of Kalyani
University Grants Commission
National Assessment and Accreditation Council

Women's universities and colleges in West Bengal
Universities and colleges in Nadia district
Colleges affiliated to University of Kalyani
Educational institutions established in 1958
1958 establishments in West Bengal